Letters to Juliet is a 2010 American romantic comedy-drama film starring Amanda Seyfried, Christopher Egan, Gael García Bernal, Vanessa Redgrave and Franco Nero. This was the final film of director Gary Winick before his death on February 27, 2011. The film was released theatrically in North America and other countries on May 14, 2010. The idea for the film was inspired by the 2006 non-fiction book Letters to Juliet, by Lise Friedman and Ceil Friedman, which chronicles the phenomenon of letter-writing to Shakespeare's most famous romantic character.

Plot 
Sophie is a young American woman who works for The New Yorker as a fact checker. She goes on a pre-honeymoon with her chef fiancé Victor to Verona, Italy. Victor is unmoved by the romance of Italy and uses his time constructively to research his soon-to-open restaurant, often neglecting Sophie. Sophie discovers that thousands of trite "letters to Juliet" left in Juliet's Verona courtyard are typically answered by the "Secretaries of Juliet". Sophie asks to join them and accidentally finds an unanswered letter by a Claire Smith from 1957. She answers it and within a week the now-elderly Claire arrives in Verona with her handsome barrister grandson Charlie Wyman. Claire and Sophie take an instant liking to each other, but Charlie and Sophie do not get along.

Following the advice in Sophie's reply, Claire decides to look for her long-lost love, Lorenzo Bartolini. Sophie, thinking Claire's story might help her with her writing career and having genuine interest in the story, helps Claire. The two find out that there are seventy-four Lorenzo Bartolinis living in the area. After many days of searching for the right Lorenzo, they find that one is dead. Charlie blames Sophie for his grandmother's sadness. He accuses her of not knowing what real loss is. Claire, witnessing the dispute, tells Charlie that he was wrong and that Sophie's mother had walked away from her when she was a little girl.

The following day, Claire insists that Charlie apologize to Sophie at breakfast, which he does. After dinner, Sophie talks to Charlie about love, still believing Claire's Lorenzo is still alive, and the two kiss. The following morning is their last day of searching for Lorenzo. On a whim, Claire points out a vineyard to Charlie and asks if he could stop so they can have a farewell drink for Sophie. As Charlie drives down the road, Claire sees a young man who looks exactly like her Lorenzo. They discover the young man is Lorenzo Bartolini's grandson, and Claire and the elder Lorenzo reunite. When Sophie heads back to Verona, Claire pushes Charlie to pursue her, but he backs off when he sees Sophie with Victor.

Back in New York, exhausted by the differences and lack of passion in their relationship, Sophie breaks up with Victor before returning to Verona to crash Claire and Lorenzo's wedding. She finds Charlie with another woman, and impulsively runs out crying. Charlie comes out to find her, and she admits she loves him but tells him to go back to his girlfriend. Charlie reveals that the woman is his cousin, not his girlfriend, and tells Sophie he loves her. He climbs up the vine to the balcony, recreating the famous scene from Romeo and Juliet, but accidentally falls down, and they kiss as he lies on the ground as Claire, Lorenzo, and the wedding guests come to see what happened.

Cast 

 Amanda Seyfried as Sophie Hall, a fact checker living in New York
 Christopher Egan as Charlie Wyman, Claire's grandson, who has trouble coming to terms with his grandmother loving anyone other than his late grandfather. His parents died in a car accident.
 Gael García Bernal as Victor, Sophie's hard-working chef fiancé who is easily preoccupied with anything having to do with food, cooking, and the opening of his restaurant. They later break up.
 Vanessa Redgrave as Claire, the woman who wrote the letter to Juliet 50 years before, and is hoping to find her Lorenzo.
 Franco Nero as Lorenzo, Claire's love interest. Nero is Redgrave's real life husband. Roger Ebert, having interviewed both Nero and Redgrave on the set of Camelot in 1966where they met, fell in love, separated, then married 40 years laternoted how much of the love story between their characters is nearly autobiographical.
 Luisa Ranieri as Isabella, one of the four original Juliet's secretaries
 Marina Massironi as Francesca, one of Juliet's secretaries.
 Milena Vukotic as Maria, one of Juliet's secretaries.
 Luisa De Santis as Angelina, Isabella's mother.
 Lidia Biondi as Donatella, one of Juliet's secretaries.

In addition, Oliver Platt briefly appears as Sophie's boss in New York, while Stefano Guerrini makes a brief appearance as Lorenzo's grandson, who catches Claire's attention as he looks like Lorenzo once did.

Release and reception

Critical reception 
Letters to Juliet received mixed reviews from critics. The site's critical consensus reads: "Letters to Juliet has a refreshingly earnest romantic charm, but it suffers from limp dialogue and an utter lack of surprises." Metacritic gives it an average score of 50 out of 100 based on 34 critics, indicating "mixed or average reviews".

The Guardians Peter Bradshaw called the film "cheerfully ridiculous", pointing out the differing accents from both Amanda Seyfried and Christopher Egan, but gave praise to Vanessa Redgrave for a "likably, if not quite intentionally mad performance." Amy Biancolli of the San Francisco Chronicle was also positive towards Redgrave, describing her performance as being "elegant, clear-eyed and nurturing" and noting that she "commands the corniest dialogue to stand up and sound like poetry." Elizabeth Weitzman of the New York Daily News praised both Redgrave and Seyfried, saying the former brings "a lovely gravity to the lightweight proceedings" and the latter displays "an unusually levelheaded presence." Roger Ebert was aware of the film's genre and how it operates but that he didn't care about that: "I know the ending is preordained from the setup. I know the characters are broad and comforting stereotypes. In this case, I simply don't care. Sometimes we have personal reasons for responding to a film."

Bill Gibron from PopMatters criticized the film for having two conflicting stories where only one is interesting, characters that make idiotic decisions for the plot to progress and have little romantic chemistry together that results in a lack of emotional resonance for the viewers, saying that "Letters to Juliet loses on all counts. It's not a comedy. It's barely romantic, and even the scenery looks filtered through a couple dozen attempts at post-production color timing (no nation is this…golden)." Nick Schager of Slant Magazine was negative towards its "cornball fairy-tale romanticism", criticizing the performances of Seyfried and Egan for having "a prototypically bland rom-com heroine" and being "laughably phony" in the material both given respectively, and found the plot to be of "dime store novel-quality." Kyle Smith of the New York Post also saw the generic plot "as straight and obvious as raw spaghetti", and gave half-hearted praise to the line delivery of Seyfried and Egan, saying they "may be the perfect actors to carry out this assignment: Neither is embarrassable."

Box office 
Letters to Juliet opened at #3 to $13,540,486 behind Iron Man 2s second weekend and Robin Hood. In its second weekend, the film dropped 33.5% with $9,006,266 and with the arrival of Shrek Forever After the film slipped to #4. The film eventually grossed $53,032,453 domestically and $79,181,750 worldwide.

Soundtrack 
 "You Got Me" – Colbie Caillat
 "Chianti Country"
 "Verona" – Andy Georges
 "Un Giorno Così" – 883
 "Per Avere Te" – Franco Morselli
 "Quando, Quando, Quando" – Laura Jane (as Lisa Jane) and Chris Mann
 "Variations On A Theme By Mozart" – from The Magic Flute, Opus 9
 "Sospesa" – Malika Ayane and Pacifico
 "Per Dimenticare" – Zero Assoluto
 "Sono Bugiarda (I'm A Liar)" – Caterina Caselli
 "Guarda Che Luna" – Fred Buscaglione
 "Love Story" – Taylor Swift
 "What If" – Colbie Caillat

References

External links 

 
 
 
 
 
 Juliet Club , Club di Giulietta, City of Verona, website

2010 films
2010 romantic comedy-drama films
American romantic comedy-drama films
Films about postal systems
Films about vacationing
Films directed by Gary Winick
Films set in New York City
Films set in Veneto
Films set in Verona
Films shot in New York City
Films shot in Tuscany
Romeo and Juliet
Summit Entertainment films
2010s English-language films
2010s American films